Walgett Airport  is an airport in Walgett, New South Wales, Australia.

Airlines and destinations

See also
List of airports in New South Wales

References

Airports in New South Wales